Acoso y derribo is  traditional sport in the doma vaquera equestrian tradition of Spain, in which cattle are brought to the ground by two riders, the garrochista and the amparador, using the garrocha or lance. The horses used are often of Hispano-Árabe stock.

The corral for this competition is divided into four areas.

In 2010 the  decided to eliminate this competition from the official list.

References

External links
 Club Taurino of London: An Introduction to Acoso y Derribo (Feria de Caballo, Jerez, 2006), Diana Thurston
https://web.archive.org/web/20120701142809/http://portaltaurino.net/especiales/otros_especiales/acoso_derribo.htm

Working stock horse sports
Sports originating in Spain